— The "Ode of Remembrance", an ode taken from Laurence Binyon's "For the Fallen", first published in The Times of London in September of this year.

Nationality words link to articles with information on the nation's poetry or literature (for instance, Irish or France).

Events

 January 1 – The Egoist, a London literary magazine is founded by Dora Marsden, a successor to The New Freewoman (the new publication will go defunct in 1919); it publishes early modernist works, including those of James Joyce
 January 18 – A party held in honor of English poet Wilfrid Scawen Blunt at his stud farm in West Sussex brings together W. B. Yeats, Ezra Pound, Thomas Sturge Moore, Victor Plarr, Richard Aldington, F. S. Flint and Frederic Manning; peacock is on the menu
 January 29 – Yone Noguchi lectures on "The Japanese Hokku Poetry" at Magdalen College, Oxford
 February–December – Publication of New Numbers, a quarterly collection of work by the Dymock poets in England edited by Lascelles Abercrombie
 March – The Little Review founded by Margaret Caroline Anderson as part of Chicago's literary renaissance
 April 20 – American poet Ezra Pound marries English artist Dorothy Shakespear at St Mary Abbots church, Kensington, London
 June 5 – Rupert Brooke returns to England at Plymouth after a year's tour of North America and Tahiti
 June 24 – Edward Thomas makes the English railway journey which inspires his poem Adlestrop en route  to meet Robert Frost, who encourages him to begin writing poetry
 July 2 – BLAST, a short-lived literary magazine of the Vorticist movement, is founded with the publication of the first of its total of two editions, edited by Wyndham Lewis
 August – The literature of World War I makes its first appearance. John Masefield writes the poem "August, 1914" (published in the September 1 issue of The English Review), the last he will produce before the peace.
September – J. R. R. Tolkien writes a poem about Eärendil, the first appearance of his mythopoeic Middle-earth legendarium. At this time Tolkien is an Oxford undergraduate staying at Phoenix Farm, Gedling near Nottingham.
 September 22 – T. S. Eliot (at this time in England to study) meets Ezra Pound for the first time, in London
 December – Wilhelm Apollinaris de Kostrowitzky, who writes under the pen name "Guillaume Apollinaire", enlists in the French Army to fight in World War I and becomes a French citizen after an August attempt at enlistment has been rejected
 December 3–7 – Edward Thomas writes his first poems
 December 23 – Rupert Brooke begins writing his sonnet "The Soldier" while on military training
 Jethmal Parsram (1885–1948) and Lalchand Amardinomal Jagatiani (1885–1954) found the Sindhi Sahita Society, a publishing house, in India

Works published in English

Canada
 William Wilfred Campbell, Sagas of Vaster Britain
 Katherine Hale, Grey Knitting
 Marian Osborne, Poems, Canadian poet published in the United Kingdom
 George A. MacKenzie, In that New World Which is the Old
 Laura E. McCulley, Mary Magdalene and Other Poems, 50 poems; her first book of poetry
 Beatrice Redpath, Drawn Shutters, her first book
 Lloyd Roberts, England Over Seas
 Arthur Stringer, Open Water,  London:  John Lane Co. (free verse Canadian poetry

United Kingdom
 Laurence Binyon, The Winnowing-Fan, including "For the Fallen", part of which was excerpted to become "Ode of Remembrance" (written at Pentire Head, Cornwall, and originally published in The Times (London) September 21)
 Wilfrid Scawen Blunt, Poetical Works
 W. H. Davies, The Bird of Paradise, and Other Poems
 Wilfrid Gibson
 Borderlands
 Thoroughfares
 Thomas Hardy
 Satires of Circumstance (including the sequence "Poems 1912–13")
 "Men Who March Away" (September 5, published as "Song of the Soldiers" in The Times (London) September 9)
 Ford Madox Hueffer, Collected Poems
 John Masefield, Philip the King, and Other Poems
 Marian Osborne, Poems, Canadian poet published in the United Kingdom
 Ezra Pound, editor, Des Imagistes: An Anthology,  the first anthology of the Imagism movement; published by the Poetry Bookshop in London and issued in America both in book form and simultaneously in the literary periodical The Glebe for February 1914 (issue #5)
 Arthur Knowles Sabin, War Harvest, 1914
 Katharine Tynan, The Flower of Peace
 W. B. Yeats, Responsibilities, Irish poet published in the United Kingdom

United States
 Conrad Aiken, Earth Triumphant
 Emily Dickinson, The Single Hound, published posthumously (died 1886)
 Robert Frost, North of Boston, including "Mending Wall"
 Joyce Kilmer, Trees and Other Poems, including "Trees", which first appeared in Poetry magazine in August 1913)
 Ezra Pound, editor, Des Imagistes: An Anthology,  the first anthology of the Imagism movement; published by the Poetry Bookshop in London and issued in America both in book form and simultaneously in the literary periodical The Glebe for February 1914 (issue #5)
 Vachel Lindsay, The Congo and Other Poems
 Amy Lowell, Sword Blades and Poppy Seed
 James Oppenheim, Songs for the New Age
 Carl Sandburg, "Chicago" in Poetry magazine
 Gertrude Stein, Tender Buttons
 Wallace Stevens' first major publication (of his poem "Phases") is in the November issue of Poetry The poem was written when Stevens was 35, and he is a rare example of a poet whose main output came at a fairly advanced age. (Many of his canonical works were written well after he turned fifty.) According to the literary critic Harold Bloom, no Western writer since Sophocles has had such a late flowering of artistic genius.

Other in English
 Christopher Brennan, Poems: 1913, Australia
 Prafulla Ranjan Das, The Mother and the Star; Indian, Indian poetry in English
 W. B. Yeats, Responsibilities, Irish poet published in the United Kingdom

Works published in other languages

Indian
 Narasinghrao, Nupurjhankar (Indian, writing in Gujarati)

Telugu language
 Kattamanci Ramalinga Reddi, Kavitya Tattva Vicaramu, criticism
 Ramalinga Reddi / Kattamanci Ramalinga Reddi, Kavitya Tattva Vicaramu, book of criticism, called a "very controversial" and "scathing critique of traditional poetry" and also a "pioneering work in modern Telugu criticism"
 Burra Seshagiri Rao, Vimarsadarsamu, book partly about the relationship between poetry and society

Other languages
 Anna Akhmatova, The Rosary, Russia, her second collection; by this time there are thousands of women composing their poems "after Akhmatova"; the book becomes so popular in Russia that a "parlor game based upon the book was even invented. One person would recite a line of poetry and the next person would try to recite the next, until the entire book was recited."
 Julius Bab, ed., 1914: der deutsche Krieg im deutschen Gedicht, Germany
 José Santos Chocano, Puerto Rico lírico y otros poemas, Peru
 Janus Djurhuus, Yrkingar, Faroese
 Walter Flex, Das Volk in Eisen, Germany
 Krishnala M. Jhaveri, Milestones in Gujarati Literature written in English and translated into Gujarati; scholarship and criticism in (India)
 Vasily Kamensky, Tango with Cows: Ferro-Concrete Poems (Танго С Коровами: Железобетонныя Поэмы), Russia
 Ernst Lissauer, "Song of Hate against England" (Hassgesang gegen England), Germany
 Stéphane Mallarmé, Un Coup de dés jamais n'abolira le hasard ("A Throw of the Dice will Never Abolish Chance"), originally published in Cosmopolis magazine in 1897, posthumously published in book form for the first time, in a limited, 60-copy edition by the Imprimerie Sainte Catherine at Bruges, Belgium
 Gabriela Mistral, Sonetos de la muerte ("Sonnets of Death"), Chile
 Patrick Pearse, Suantraidhe agus Goltraidhe (Songs of Sleep and of Sorrow), Ireland
 Rainer Maria Rilke, Fünf Gesänge, August 1914 ("Five Hymns, August 1914"), written, Germany
 Ernst Stadler, Der Aufbruch ("The Departure"), this German poet's most important volume of verse, regarded as a key work of early Expressionism; he is killed in battle this year
 Georg Trakl, "Grodek", Austria, posthumously published in Der Brenner

Awards and honors

Births
Death years link to the corresponding "[year] in poetry" article:

 January 14 – Dudley Randall (died 2000) African American poet and poetry publisher, founding Broadside Press in 1965
 January 17 – William Stafford (died 1993), American poet
 February 7 – David Ignatow (died 1997), American poet
 February 14 – Jan Nisar Akhtar (died 1976) Indian poet of Urdu ghazals and nazms and lyricist for Bollywood
 February 22 – Henry Reed (died 1986), English poet.
 February 24 – Weldon Kees (missing and presumed dead, 1955), American poet, critic, novelist, short story writer, composer and artist.
 February 25 – John Arlott (died 1991), English cricket commentator and poet
 March 31 – Octavio Paz (died 1998) Mexican writer, poet, diplomat, and winner of the Nobel Prize in Literature in 1990
 May 3 – Georges-Emmanuel Clancier (died 2018), French poet, novelist, broadcaster and journalist
 May 6 – Randall Jarrell (died 1965), American poet and writer
 June 2 - George Hitchcock (died 2010), American poet, editor and publisher of Kayak magazine and books (1964–1984)
 June 26 – Laurie Lee (died 1997), English memoirist and poet
 September 1 – Jean Burden (died 2008), American poet, editor, essayist and pet-care writer
 September 5 – Nicanor Parra (died 2018), Chilean poet and physicist
 September 29 – D. J. Opperman (died 1985), South African Afrikaans poet
 July 30 – Tachihara Michizō 立原道造 (died 1939), Japanese poet and architect
 October 25 – John Berryman (born John Allyn Smith) (died 1972) American poet considered one of the founders of the Confessional school of poetry
 October 27 – Dylan Thomas (died 1953), Welsh poet
 October 30 – James Laughlin (died 1997), American poet and literary book publisher, founder of New Directions Publishers
 November 1 – Yamazaki Hōdai 山崎方代 (died 1985), Shōwa period tanka poet (family name: Yamazaki)
 Also:
Punkunnam Damodaran, Indian, Malayalam-language poet and playwright
 Devakanta Barua, Indian, Assamese-language poet
 G. V. Krishna Rao (died 1979), Indian, Telugu-language poet and novelist
 Ghulam Ahmad Fazil Kashmiri (died 2004), also known as "Fazil Kashmiri", Indian, Kashmiri-language poet (surname: Fazil)
 Kunjabihari Das, Indian, Orissa-language poet, folklorist, travel writer and memoirist
 Laksmidhar Nayak, Indian, Oriya playwright, novelist, poet and labor leader
 Narayan Bezbarua, Indian, Assamese-language poet, novelist and playwright
 Narmada Prasad Khare, Indian, Hindi-language poet and editor

Deaths
Birth years link to the corresponding "[year] in poetry" article:
 January 13 – John Philip Bourke (born 1860), Australian poet
 March 17 – Hiraide Shū 平出修 (born 1878), late Meiji period novelist, poet, and lawyer; represented defendant in the High Treason Incident; co-founder of the literary journal Subaru
 July 6 – Delmira Agustini (born 1886), Uruguayan poet
 July 23 – Charlotte Forten Grimké, 76, African-American anti-slavery activist, poet and teacher
 September 4 – Charles Péguy, 41 (born 1873), French poet and essayist, killed in action near Villeroy, Seine-et-Marne, in the early months of World War I
 September 8 – Hans Leybold, 22 (born 1892), German Expressionist poet, suicide while on active service in Belgium
 September 25 – Alfred Lichtenstein, 25 (born 1889), German Expressionist writer, killed in action in France
 October 8 – Adelaide Crapsey, 26 (born 1878), American poet
 October 10 – Ernst Stadler, 31 (born 1883), German poet, killed in battle at Zandvoorde near Ypres
 November 3 – Georg Trakl, 27, Austrian poet, suicide
 December 8 – Madison Cawein (born 1865), American poet
 December 19 – Jane Elizabeth Conklin (born 1831), American poet and religious writer
 Also:
 Kerala Varma Valiya Koil Thampuran, also known as Kerala Varma (born 1845 in poetry), Indian, Malayalam-language poet and translator who had an equal facility in writing in English and Sanskrit
 K. C. Kesava Pillai (born 1868), Indian, Malayalam-language musician and poet

See also

 List of years in poetry
 Dada
 Dymock poets
 Imagism
 Modernist poetry in English
 Russian Futurism movement in Russian poetry
 Silver Age of Russian Poetry
 Ego-Futurism movement in Russian poetry
 Expressionism movement in German poetry
 Young Poland (Polish: Młoda Polska) modernist period in Polish arts and literature
 Poetry

Notes

Poetry
20th-century poetry